Athletics competitions at the 1989 South Pacific Mini Games were held at the Teufaiva Stadium in Nukuʻalofa, Tonga, between August 24–30, 1989.

A total of 40 events were contested, 23 by men and 17 by women.

Medal summary
Medal winners and their results were published on the Athletics Weekly webpage
courtesy of Tony Isaacs and Børre Lilloe, and on the Oceania Athletics Association webpage by Bob Snow.

Complete results can also be found on the Oceania Athletics Association, and on the Athletics PNG webpages.

Men

Women

Medal table (unofficial)

Participation (unofficial)
Athletes from the following 13 countries were reported to participate:

 
 
 
/

References

External links
Pacific Games Council
Oceania Athletics Association

Athletics at the Pacific Mini Games
Athletics in Tonga
South Pacific Mini Games
1989 in Tongan sport
1989 Pacific Games